Eupithecia dissonans is a moth in the  family Geometridae. It is found in Madagascar.

References

Moths described in 1954
dissonans
Moths of Madagascar